During 1977, tropical cyclones formed within seven different tropical cyclone basins, located within various parts of the Atlantic, Pacific and Indian Oceans. During the year, a total of 125 tropical cyclones had formed this year to date, while a record low of 64 tropical cyclones were named.

The most active basin in the year was the Western Pacific, which, however, documented only 19 named systems, but had over 50 tropical depressions forming. Conversely, both the North Atlantic hurricane and North Indian Ocean cyclone seasons experienced very highly below the long-term average number of cyclones reaching tropical storm intensity in recorded history, both numbering 6, respectively. Activity across the southern hemisphere's three basins—South-West Indian, Australian, and South Pacific—was just almost spread evenly, with each region recording an average total of 12 tropical cyclones.

The costliest tropical cyclone of the year was Hurricane Anita in the Atlantic which struck Northern Mexico in very late August. Damages are still unknown to date, but most estimates say that Anita caused at least US$500 million in total damage. The deadliest tropical cyclone of the year was the 1977 Andhra Pradesh cyclone in the North Indian Ocean, which killed at least 10 thousand people in the state of Andhra Pradesh in India. The cyclone became the most intense cyclone to hit the state since reliable records began in 1891. It was also the third recorded Super Cyclonic Storm in the satellite era of the basin which began on 1960.

Global atmospheric and hydrological conditions

Summary

Systems

January 

During January, a total of 9 tropical cyclones formed within the month with eight of those further intensifying to become official named systems. 1977 is one of only a few years to feature no storms forming in December of the previous year and dissipating in January of the listed year.

February

March

April

May

June

July

August

September

October

November

December

References 

Tropical cyclones in 1977